Kurogane may refer to:

 Kurogane (manga), a Japanese manga series
 Kurogane (Tsubasa: Reservoir Chronicle), a character in the anime and manga series Tsubasa: Reservoir Chronicle
 Tokyu Kogyo Kurogane, one of the first Japanese automakers
 Kurogane Type 95, a Japanese WW2 era military reconnaissance car with four-wheel-drive 
 Kurogane Communication, a Japonese manga series